Cadwell is a town in Laurens County, Georgia, United States. The population was 528 at the 2010 census, up from 329 at the 2000 census. It is part of the Dublin Micropolitan Statistical Area.

History
The Georgia General Assembly incorporated the place as the "Town of Cadwell" in 1907. The community was named after Matthew and Rebecca Cadwell, the original owners of the town site.

Geography

Cadwell is located in southwestern Laurens County at  (32.340353, -83.042462). State Route 126 passes through the center of Cadwell as Burch Street; it leads northwest  to Chester and southeast  to Alamo.

The west side of the town drains to Bay Creek, a south-flowing tributary of Alligator Creek and part of the Ocmulgee River watershed. The east side drains via Long Branch to Lime Sink Creek, a tributary of Alligator Creek and the Ocmulgee.

Demographics

As of the census of 2000, there were 329 people, 136 households, and 93 families residing in the town. The racial makeup of the town was 86.32% White, 13.07% African American, 0.30% Asian, and 0.30% from two or more races. Hispanic or Latino of any race were 0.91% of the population.

There were 136 households, out of which 27.2% had children under the age of 18 living with them, 49.3% were married couples living together, 16.9% had a female householder with no husband present, and 31.6% were non-families. 26.5% of all households were made up of individuals, and 14.7% had someone living alone who was 65 years of age or older.  The average household size was 2.42 and the average family size was 2.88.

In the town, the population was spread out, with 24.0% under the age of 18, 8.8% from 18 to 24, 25.2% from 25 to 44, 24.6% from 45 to 64, and 17.3% who were 65 years of age or older.  The median age was 40 years. For every 100 females, there were 86.9 males.  For every 100 females age 18 and over, there were 85.2 males.

The median income for a household in the town was $32,727, and the median income for a family was $38,750. Males had a median income of $28,417 versus $19,773 for females. The per capita income for the town was $16,372.  About 4.0% of families and 11.0% of the population were below the poverty line, including 7.5% of those under age 18 and 21.2% of those age 65 or over.

References

Towns in Laurens County, Georgia
Towns in Georgia (U.S. state)
Dublin, Georgia micropolitan area